Broughton is a locality in West Wimmera Shire and the Shire of Hindmarsh in Victoria, Australia. The locality was named after the Broughton family who owned several properties in the area.

References

Towns in Victoria (Australia)